Lavik is a village in Høyanger Municipality in Vestland county, Norway. In 2001, the Lavik area had a population of about 1000 people, with about 285 living in the village of Lavik.

The village of Lavik has historically been a farming community but it has more recently been developing into a transportation hub along the European route E39 highway, the main highway from Bergen to Trondheim. Lavik is the northern point of the Lavik to Ytre Oppedal ferry served by Fjord1 Nordvestlandske that crosses the Sognefjorden as part of the E39 highway. This route is served by the MV Ampere, the world's first battery electric car ferry. There are several services in the small harbour area: a snack bar, a pizzeria, a hotel, and restaurant on the Sognefjorden. There is also a supermarket, a bank, a service station, and several other shops in Lavik.

The village is also home to Lavik Church and it was historically the administrative centre of the old municipality of Lavik from 1838 until 1861. In 1861, Lavik municipality was merged with Brekke municipality to form Lavik og Brekke municipality. From 1861 until 1905, the village of Lavik was the administrative centre of that municipality as well. In 1905, the municipality was divided into Lavik and Brekke municipalities once again. The village continued to be the administrative centre of Lavik until 1964 when Lavik municipality was merged into the new municipality of Høyanger. The administrative centre of the new municipality was moved to the village of Høyanger.

Name
The village area is named after the old Ladvik farm, since Lavik Church is located there. The first element comes from the Old Norse word hlað which means "pile" or "load".  The second element possibly comes from the Old Norse word víkr which means "inlet". Historically the spelling has varied greatly. It was Laduigh in the 16th century, Laduig in the 17th century, Ladvig in the 18th century, Ladevig in the 19th century, and finally Lavik in the 20th century.

References

Villages in Vestland
Høyanger